Chapel House may refer to:

in the United Kingdom
Chapel House Estate, England
Chapel House, Twickenham, Greater London, occupied at one time by Alfred Lord Tennyson
Chapel House, Monmouth, Wales

in the United States
 Chapel House (Guilderland, New York), listed on U.S. National Register of Historic Places in Albany County, New York